The Sea Inside is a 2004 Spanish psychological drama film co-written and directed by Alejandro Amenábar, who also co-produced, scored and edited. It is based on the real-life story of Ramón Sampedro (played by Javier Bardem), who was left quadriplegic after a diving accident, and his 28-year campaign in support of euthanasia and the right to end his life. The film won the Academy Award for Best Foreign Language Film.

Plot
This is the life story of Spaniard Ramón Sampedro, who fought a 28-year campaign to win the right to end his own life with assisted suicide. The film explores Ramón's relationships with two women: Julia, a lawyer suffering from Cadasil syndrome who supports his cause, and Rosa, a local woman who wants to convince him that his life is worth living. Through the gift of his love, these two women are inspired to accomplish things they never previously thought possible.

Ramón, now 54 years old, has been fighting for 26 years for his right to die following a diving incident which left him paralysed from the neck down. He is unable to end his life by himself and does not wish to implicate his family or friends, as by Spanish law, they would be charged with murder or assisting a suicide. Following the death of his mother, he is cared for by his sister-in-law, Manuela. Ramón's elder brother José does not believe he should have the right to die; both Manuela and her son, Javier, believe in his case.

Ramón's friend Gené, who works for an organisation fighting for the right to die, puts him in contact with Julia, a lawyer. As she seeks to learn more about him and his situation in order to fight for his cause, he recounts his past and his reasons for wanting to die: He says that there is no dignity in living paralysed. After seeing his story online, Rosa visits Ramón to convince him to live. He demands that she respect his wishes and she leaves, upset. Later, whilst DJing her part-time radio show, she apologises on air in the hopes that he is listening. She continues to visit, bringing her children, and the two strike up a friendship. Despite romantic interest in both women, Ramón maintains that he is spoken for by death.

Julia reads Ramón's memoir describing his life and experiences as a quadriplegic and urges him to publish it. He imagines flying from his bed to visit her on the beach. Later, she is hospitalised with a stroke and admitted to rehab to relearn how to walk. The two write letters to each other, sending updates of their lives. Ramón loses a court case for his right to die. Rosa, in tears, appears at his house and Ramón admits that he has planned a way to commit suicide without the direct and obvious involvement of anyone else.

Meanwhile, Padre Francisco, a quadriplegic Catholic priest, comes to convince Ramón to want to live. Ramón refuses to be carried downstairs and so the two men converse through the help of a church boy, who runs up and down to share their arguments. Angry and upset, Manuela asks him to leave. Julia visits to assist Ramón in writing his memoir whilst his family and friends discuss his right to die. Divided, they fight. But Ramón is unwavering in his wish. Again, he imagines that he is able-bodied, kissing Julia. Later, she admits that her condition will only become more severe and that she is planning to kill herself. But first, she would like to help Ramón.

Ramón and Javier work together to design and build a wheelchair for him in which he can appear in court to fight for his own right to die. His appeal is ultimately rejected, but Ramón eventually fulfils his wish nonetheless. Each of his friends and family complete a small action in his death; not enough to convict any of them of his murder or assisting his suicide. He records himself on a video camera, narrating his own death, before ingesting a cyanide-laced drink that kills him.

Cast

Sampedro family
Javier Bardem as Ramón Sampedro
Celso Bugallo as José Sampedro, Ramón's elder brother
Mabel Rivera as Manuela, José's wife and Ramón's caregiver
Tamar Novas as Javier Sampedro, Ramón's nephew
Joan Dalmau as Joaquín Sampedro, Ramón and José's father

Ramon's friends
Belén Rueda as Julia
Alberto Jiménez as Germán, Julia's husband
Lola Dueñas as Rosa
Nicolás Fernández Luna as Cristian, Rosa's elder son
Raúl Lavisier as Samuel, her younger son
Clara Segura as Gené
Francesc Garrido as Marc, Gené's husband

Others
Josep Maria Pou as Padre Francisco, a quadriplegic Catholic priest
Alberto Amarilla as Hermano Andrés
Andrea Occhipinti as Santiago
Federico Pérez Rey as Conductor (Driver)
Xosé Manuel Olveira as Juez 1 (Judge 1)
César Cambeiro as Juez 2
Xosé Manuel Esperanto as Periodista 1 (Reporter 1)
Yolanda Muiños as Periodista 2
Adolfo Obregón as Ejecutivo (Executive)
José Luis Rodríguez as Presentador (TV host)
Julio Jordán as Encuadernador (Bookbinder)
Juan Manuel Vidal as Amigo Ramón (Ramón's friend)
Marta Larralde as Muchacha en la playa (Girl on beach)
Jacob Ahlgren as himself (Baller)

Reception

Critical response
The film received positive reviews from critics. It currently holds an 84% rating on Rotten Tomatoes based on 135 reviews, with an average rating of 7.6/10. Its consensus summary states: "Held aloft by a transfixing performance from Javier Bardem as a terminally ill man who chooses to die, The Sea Inside transcends its melodramatic story with tenderness and grace." Metacritic assigned the film a weighted average score of 74 out of 100, based on 38 critics, indicating "generally favorable reviews".

Accolades

See also

 List of Spanish films of 2004
Whose Life Is It Anyway? (1981)

References

External links
Promotional site for US region

The Sea Inside in Encyclopedia of Contemporary Spanish Film. Eds. Alex Pinar and Salvador Jimenez Murguia. Rowman & Littlefield, 2018

2004 drama films
2000s psychological drama films
French biographical drama films
French psychological drama films
Italian psychological drama films
Spanish biographical drama films
Best Film Goya Award winners
Best Foreign Language Film Academy Award winners
Best Foreign Language Film Golden Globe winners
Films about euthanasia
Films about paraplegics or quadriplegics
Films directed by Alejandro Amenábar
Films featuring a Best Actor Goya Award-winning performance
Films featuring a Best Actress Goya Award-winning performance
Films featuring a Best Supporting Actor Goya Award-winning performance
Films featuring a Best Supporting Actress Goya Award-winning performance
Films set in Spain
Films set in the 1990s
Films shot in Barcelona
Films shot in Madrid
Galicia (Spain) in fiction
Catalan-language films
2000s Spanish-language films
Galician-language films
Venice Grand Jury Prize winners
Independent Spirit Award for Best Foreign Film winners
2004 independent films
Films with screenplays by Mateo Gil
2000s Spanish films
2000s French films
2000s Italian films
Films about disability
Films set in Galicia (Spain)